Lanús is the capital of Lanús Partido, Buenos Aires Province in Argentina. It lies just south of the capital city Buenos Aires, in the Greater Buenos Aires metropolitan area. The city has a population of 212,152, and the Partido de Lanús has a total population of 453,500.

Overview

A major industrial centre, it is served by freight and passenger railway lines. The city has chemical, armaments, textiles, paper, leather and rubber goods, wire, apparel, oils and lubricants industries, as well as tanneries, vegetable and fruit canneries. Several technical schools are located in the city, as well as the Eva Perón Medical Center, one of the largest in the Greater Buenos Aires area.

The city has a football club, Club Atlético Lanús currently playing in the Argentine Primera División. Club Atlético Lanús also has a basketball team.

Guillermo Gaebeler initiated the town's development, designing its first city master plan. Gaebeler established the town as Villa General Paz on October 20, 1888, and named its first streets and plazas after the numerous battles won by General José María Paz in the Argentine Civil Wars of the mid-19th century. Lanús was officially renamed in 1955 in honor of Anacarsis Lanús, who owned the land where the city is today located until his death in 1887.

Notable people associated with Lanús
Horacio Accavallo - boxer
Luca Andrada - professional footballer
Hugo Arana - actor
Alfredo Arias - theatre producer
Gustavo Cordera - rock musician
Diego Maradona - football legend, star of the 1986 World Cup
Ricardo Montaner - famous Latin musician
Sandro - popular crooner
Babasónicos - rock band
Gastón Fernández - football player for Portland Timbers
Diego Valeri - football player for Club Atlético Lanús, all-time top scorer for Portland Timbers
Walter Montillo - football player for Shandong Luneng
Adrian Ricchiuti - football player for Calcio Catania
Marcela Morelo - Latin singer and composer
Julie Gonzalo - actress
Francisco Álvarez - actor
Ariel González - rock musician, songwriter and arranger 
Sergio Olguín - writer, journalist and editor; wrote a novel, Lanús.

References

External links

 Official Website of Club Atlético Lanús
 National University of Lanús

 
Populated places in Buenos Aires Province
Populated places established in 1888
1888 establishments in Argentina
Cities in Argentina
Argentina